Eight ships of the Royal Navy have borne the name HMS Arethusa after the Greek mythological nymph Arethusa who was transformed by Artemis into a fountain.

  was a 32-gun fifth-rate ship captured from the French Navy in 1759 and wrecked in 1779. Its Action of 17 June 1778 is the subject of the ballad: The Saucy Arethusa.
  was a 38-gun fifth-rate launched in 1781 and broken up in 1814.
  was a 46-gun fifth-rate launched in 1817, and renamed HMS Bacchus in 1844 upon her conversion into a hulk; she was broken up in 1883.
  was a 50-gun fourth-rate launched in 1849. She was fitted with screw propulsion in 1861 and became a training ship in 1874. She was broken up in 1934.
  was a Leander-class protected cruiser launched in 1882 and scrapped in 1905.
  was an Arethusa-class light cruiser launched in 1913 and wrecked after being damaged by a naval mine in 1916.
  was an Arethusa-class light cruiser launched in 1934 and scrapped in 1950.
  was a Leander-class frigate launched in 1963 and sunk as training target in 1991.

Battle honours
Ushant 1778 & 1781
St Lucia 1796
Curacao 1807
Black Sea 1854
China 1900
Heligoland 1914
Dogger Bank 1915
Norway 1940-41
Malta Convoys 1941-42
Normandy 1944

See also

References

Royal Navy ship names